Marc Pittonet (born 3 June 1996) is an Australian rules footballer who plays for the Carlton Football Club in the Australian Football League (AFL). He previously played for the Hawthorn Football Club from 2015 to 2019.

AFL career
Pittonet was drafted by Hawthorn Football Club with pick 50 in 2014 AFL Draft from the Oakleigh Chargers in the TAC Cup, the first of only two ruckman drafted that day. He made his AFL debut against  in Round 1, 2016 as a late change, but never commanded a regular place in the senior team in five seasons with Hawthorn, managing only seven senior games over that time as a back-up ruckman to Ben McEvoy and Jonathon Ceglar. He played primarily for Box Hill, Hawthorn's , over that time, and was a dominant force in the ruck in the club's 2018 VFL grand final victory with 57 hitouts.

At the end of 2019, with two ruckmen still ahead of him at Hawthorn, Pittonet requested a trade to the Carlton Football Club in search of greater senior opportunity; he was traded along with draft pick 61 in exchange for picks 54 and 63. Pittonet was initially intended to be a back-up to veteran Matthew Kreuzer, but after Kreuzer suffered a career-ending injury in Round 1, 2020, he quickly became the club's first choice ruckman, a position he has so far held from 2020 until 2022.

Statistics
Updated to the end of round 22, 2022.

|-
| 2015 ||  || 43
| 0 || — || — || — || — || — || — || — || — || — || — || — || — || — || — || — || — || 0
|- 
| 2016 ||  || 43
| 3 || 0 || 0 || 3 || 17 || 20 || 2 || 10 || 33 || 0.0 || 0.0 || 1.0 || 5.7 || 6.7 || 0.7 || 3.3 || 11.0 || 0
|-
| 2017 ||  || 43
| 0 || — || — || — || — || — || — || — || — || — || — || — || — || — || — || — || — || 0
|-
| 2018 ||  || 27
| 2 || 0 || 1 || 3 || 6 || 9 || 3 || 7 || 50 || 0.0 || 0.5 || 1.5 || 3.0 || 4.5 || 1.5 || 3.5 || 25.0 || 0
|-
| 2019 ||  || 27
| 2 || 0 || 0 || 3 || 16 || 19 || 1 || 7 || 49 || 0.0 || 0.0 || 1.5 || 8.0 || 9.5 || 0.5 || 3.5 || 24.5 || 0
|-
| 2020 ||  || 27
| 13 || 0 || 3 || 59 || 50 || 109 || 23 || 24 || 288 || 0.0 || 0.2 || 4.5 || 3.8 || 8.3 || 1.7 || 1.8 || 22.1 || 0
|-
| 2021 ||  || 27
| 13 || 5 || 5 || 67 || 80 || 147 || 26 || 28 || 379 || 0.4 || 0.4 || 5.2 || 6.2 || 11.3 || 2.0 || 2.2 || 29.2 || 0
|-
| 2022 ||  || 27
| 7 || 0 || 1 || 19 || 46 || 65 || 11 || 12 || 152 || 0.0 || 0.1 || 2.7 || 6.6 || 9.3 || 1.6 || 1.7 || 21.6 || 
|- class="sortbottom"
! colspan=3| Career
! 40 !! 5 !! 10 !! 154 !! 215 !! 369 !! 66 !! 88 !! 951 !! 0.1 !! 0.2 !! 3.9 !! 5.4 !! 9.2 !! 1.7 !! 2.2 !! 23.9 || 0
|}

Notes

Honours and achievements
Box Hill
 VFL premiership player: 2018
 Minor premiership: 2015

Individual
  best clubman: 2021

References

External links

Oakleigh Chargers players
Hawthorn Football Club players
1996 births
Living people
Australian rules footballers from Victoria (Australia)
Box Hill Football Club players
Carlton Football Club players